Zhalinghu Township (Mandarin: 扎陵湖乡) is a township in Madoi County, Golog Tibetan Autonomous Prefecture, Qinghai, China. In 2010, Zhalinghu Township had a total population of 1,245: 630 males and 615 females: 397 aged under 14, 811 aged between 15 and 65 and 37 aged over 65.

References 

Township-level divisions of Qinghai
Golog Tibetan Autonomous Prefecture